Freakdance Records was an Espoo, Finland based record label founded by a Swedish born Max Emil Laine, currently living in Finland. They release suomisaundi music. They have CD releases from such artists as Huopatossu Mononen, Puoskari and Luomuhappo.

In spring 2007, Faerie Dragon Records (Hong Kong based electronic music label) licensed and re-issued Puoskari's "The Audio Hustler" and Luomuhappo's "Pog-o-Matic Pogómen 3000000" as enhanced digipak CD releases.

On or around March 2018, their site was changed to a black page with "The dance is over now." in Finnish and "Enjoy the silence." in English below, with a contact email for inquiries.

Discography 
 2002 - Luomuhappo - Eurogorilla 2002 Transmutation Kit (FDCD01)
 2002 - Various Artists - FreakdanceRecords02 (FDCD02) - CD
 2003 - Various Artists - FDCD03 (FDCD03) - CD
 2004 - Puoskari - The Audio Hustler (FDCD04) - CD
 2004 - Luomuhappo - Pog-O-Matic Pogómen 3000000 (FDCD05) - CD
 2005 - James Reipas - Uwaga (FDCD06) - CD
 2005 - Luomuhappo - Borealophitecus (FDCS01) - CS/MP3
 2007 - Lemon Slide - True Nature (FDCD07) - CD
 2011 - Tekniset - Teknical Problems (FDCD08) - CD
 2012 - Luomuhappo - Pallit ja Sielu (FDCD09) - CD

See also 
 List of record labels
 List of electronic music record labels

References

External links
 Last archived copy of the functioning site. Archived from original on 2018-03-18.
 Official site

Espoo
Finnish record labels
Psychedelic trance record labels
Suomisaundi